The ancient Norse rulers of Greenland were called paramount chieftains. 

Among the island nation's chieftains were:
Erik the Red, or Eirikr Thorvaldsson, the nation's first chieftain and its first settler, began rule in 985.
Leif Ericson, likely the first European to set foot in North America
Thorkell Leifsson succeeded his father, Leif, sometime after 1018.

Greenlandic politicians